The esophageal branches of left gastric artery are branches which supply the esophagus.

External links
 
 

Arteries of the abdomen